Jack Peñate (born 2 September 1984) is an English singer, songwriter, and musician.

Early life
Peñate was born in London on 2 September 1984, the son of an English mother and Spanish father. His maternal grandfather was author Mervyn Peake. He attended St. Olave's Preparatory School in New Eltham and Alleyn's School in Dulwich, then began studying for a bachelor's degree in Ancient World Studies at University College London, but dropped out at the end of the second year as interest from record labels grew. He also was a member of the National Youth Theatre.

Career

Music
Peñate made his way up the ranks of the club and bar scene of London before he was signed by record label XL Recordings. He released his first promo single in October 2006, "Second, Minute or Hour" along with its b-side track, "Got My Favourite". This single was released by the record label Young (formerly Young Turks), as a 1000-only limited 7 inch, each containing a different Polaroid photograph, taken of Peñate. And in April 2007 he released the "Spit at Stars EP". In addition to the title track, this featured "My Yvonne", "Cold Thin Line" and a cover of Darondo Pulliam and Darondo's "Didn't I". The CD edition of the EP also included the first song he ever wrote, "Jack of All Trades", which he wrote with his band at school called "Jack's Basement". He has appeared on XFM radio's "Xposure" and his first two singles were both Single of the Week on BBC Radio 1 DJ Zane Lowe's show.

On 10 August 2007, he announced that his album would be released on 1 October and be titled Matinée. However, on 7 September, this date was pushed back to 8 October, because more time was needed to "finish off all the bits of artwork for the inside cover and because my neck is playing up again." Peñate also stated that "I've been told it's now in production so hopefully there won't be any more delays." The album debuted at number seven in the UK album charts.

On 3 January 2009, XFM played a new track by Peñate called "Tonight's Today", the song ended up being the first single from his second album Everything Is New.

On 24 August 2009, Peñate released his single "Pull My Heart Away". This single was also available for free single of the week download on the Australian iTunes. This track was also played in the credits of the 2010 film Charlie St. Cloud. He has also announced an autumn tour that will take him to cities including Dublin, Belfast, Glasgow, and Manchester.

On 19 January 2012, Peñate recorded the song "No One Lied". Directed by Dani Castro, shot and recorded in one take at Peñate's home; the song was uploaded to Peñate's YouTube channel after a two-year hiatus of activity since 2010. The song was not a single and Peñate left no comment on whether it would be a hint towards a new album.

After You, the third album by Peñate, was released on 29 November 2019. "Prayer" is the first single from the album.

Live gigs and tours
At Peñate's concerts, it is customary that audience members storm the stage while the song "Torn on the Platform" is performed. One such stage invasion at the Oxford Zodiac in April 2007 resulted in a fan stealing Peñate's distortion pedal. After he realised it was missing, he proclaimed, "Whoever's got it... keep it! Just make sure you play a Telecaster through it and not a Gibson!"

Peñate was featured on BBC Three's coverage of the Glastonbury Festival on Friday 22 June 2007.
He has appeared at the Carling Weekend in Reading and Leeds. Two days after his performances at both festivals, he announced on a message on his MySpace that he would have to cancel two gigs the following week, due to severe damage to his throat which also resulted in him reducing his set length at the previous weekend's Carling Weekend.
On 8 December 2007 he performed on the Later... with Jools Holland show sharing a bill with David Gray, Rilo Kiley, The Coral, Cleo Laine and John Dankworth, amongst others.
During the summer of 2008, Jack Peñate played several live concerts with guest guitars from old school friend Felix White. This included Peñate's set at Reading of August this year.
Peñate has played gigs all over the UK on tour and has previously shared dates with his good friends Adele, and The Maccabees.  Peñate played at the 2007 Oxegen festival in Kildare, Ireland.
Peñate was one of the contributors to the "Janie Jones" charity cover single.
He was featured at music night 'Songs in the Dark' run by Jeremy Warmsley and Simon Mastrantone.
Jack Peñate performed a cover of La Roux's "Bulletproof" at the Radio 1 Live Lounge.
On 3 July 2009, he played at The Roundhouse in Camden Town, as part of the iTunes live festivals month.
Throughout Peñate's second album tour in 2009, his bandmates included Jessie Ware on backing vocals, Kwes of Warp Records on keyboards / laptop and Tic of the record label Young on rhythm guitar.
Jack Peñate, alo with Chairlift, opened for The xx at the Central Park Summer Stage on Sunday 8 August 2010.

Personal life
Peñate is a long-time close friend of Adele, with whom he grew up.

Discography

Albums

Singles

References

External links
 Official website
 
 Official widget
 Everything Is New, Pitchfork review
 Everything Is New, The Guardian review
 Everything Is New, The Sunday Times review
 The Times: Jack Penate takes on Lily Allen and Adele; 28 March 2009

1984 births
Living people
English male singer-songwriters
People from Blackheath, London
English people of Spanish descent
People educated at Alleyn's School
Alumni of University College London
XL Recordings artists
National Youth Theatre members
21st-century British singers
21st-century British male singers